Super 3 may refer to:

Super3, the Catalan language television channel
Super3 Series, an Australian motor racing series
The Super 3, an American hip hop duo